Eulalio Muñoz (born 16 July 1995) is an Argentine long-distance runner. He qualified to represent Argentina at the 2020 Summer Olympics in Tokyo 2021, competing in men's marathon.

Personal life
Muñoz was born in Gualjaina on 16 July 1995.

References

External links

 

1995 births
Living people
Argentine male long-distance runners
Athletes (track and field) at the 2020 Summer Olympics
Olympic athletes of Argentina
People from Chubut Province
21st-century Argentine people